Pinet may refer to:

Pinet (power station), a hydroelectric power station in Aveyron, France
Pinet, Albania, a village in Tirana municipality, Tirana County, Albania
Pinet, Hérault, a commune in the Hérault department in the Languedoc-Roussillon region, France
Pinet, Valencia, a municipality in the province of Valencia, Valencian Community, Spain
18111 Pinet, a main-belt asteroid